The 11:Metre One Design, also called the 11 Metre or 11 Meter, is an American trailerable sailboat that was designed by Ron Holland and Rolf Gyhlenius as a one-design racer and first built in 1990.

The design was at one time a World Sailing international class.

Production
The design was built by Precision Boat Works in Palmetto, Florida, United States, starting in 1990, with 350 boats completed, but it is now out of production.

Design
The 11 Meter is a racing keelboat, built predominantly of cored fiberglass. It has a fractional sloop rig, a raked stem, a sharply reverse transom, an internally mounted spade-type rudder controlled by a tiller and a fixed fin keel with a weighted lead bulb. It displaces  and carries  of ballast.

The design has minimal cabin space, intended for storage space.

For sailing downwind the design may be equipped with a symmetrical masthead spinnaker.

Operational history
The boat is supported by a class club that organizes racing events, the International 11:Metre One Design Class Association.

See also
List of sailing boat types

References

External links

Keelboats
Former classes of World Sailing
1990s sailboat type designs
Sailing yachts
Trailer sailers
Sailboat type designs by Ron Holland
Sailboat type designs by Rolf Gyhlenius
Sailboat types built by Precision Boat Works